Brünig or Bruenig may refer to:

 The Brünig Pass, between the Bernese Oberland and Central Switzerland
 The Brünig railway line, linking Interlaken and Lucerne in Switzerland
 Elizabeth Bruenig (born 1990), American opinion writer and editor for The Washington Post
 Matt Bruenig (born 1988), American lawyer, blogger, and policy analyst